Harry Liddell (1866–1931) was a British politician. He was elected (Irish Unionist) Member of Parliament for West Down in 1905, resigning in 1907 by becoming Steward of the Manor of Northstead.

He was born in Donacloney, Northern Ireland in 1866. Growing up, he served as an apprentice in his father's linen business. He represented the firm Liddel and Co. in the United States until his father died. He then returned to Donaghcloney and took over the business.

Liddell was elected (Irish Unionist) Member of Parliament for West Down in 1905, defeating Alderman Andrew Beattie.

References

External links 
 

1866 births
1931 deaths
People from County Down
Members of the Parliament of the United Kingdom for County Down constituencies (1801–1922)
UK MPs 1900–1906
UK MPs 1906–1910
Irish Unionist Party MPs